Mac Bohonnon (born March 27, 1995) is an American  freestyle skier originally from Madison, Connecticut. He was named to the United States National Ski Team in 2012. Bohonnon competed at the 2014 Winter Olympics in Sochi, Russia.

Career
At age thirteen, Bohonnon was the youngest athlete to be selected by the U.S. Ski Team's Development Program. In 2012, Mac was named to the U.S. Ski Team. Bohonnon's first Olympic appearance was in Sochi 2014. He placed 5th in men's aerials. Mac considers one of his inspirations to be former U.S. Olympian Eric Bergoust, a 1998 gold medalist. Coincidentally, Bergoust coached Bohonnon for two and a half years at the Olympic Training Center in Lake Placid, NY.

Career highlights
2011
2011 USSA Marriott Junior Championship: Freestyle Junior Nationals in Steamboat Springs, Colorado where he earned a perfect score
Junior Nationals Competitor 3rd overall
National Championships Competitor 4th overall
Nor-Am Tour Competitor
2012
3rd Place at US National Championships
5th Place at Junior World Championships – Valmalenco, Italy
3rd Place in the overall NorAm Grand Prix
2nd Place at USSA Marriott Junior National Championships
2nd Place at Park City NorAm Day 2 and 3
3rd Place at US Selections
19th Place at Lake Placid World Cup
2013
Junior National Champion
1st Place at Lake Placid NorAm
14th Place at Val St. Come World Cup
1st Place at USSA Marriott Junior National Championships
2014
2nd Place at Val St. Come World Cup
Currently 14th in the world
International Skiing Federation's Rookie of the Year
5th Place at Sochi Olympics Men's Freestyle Aerial Qualifying Finals

Sochi 2014
At age eighteen, Bohonnon participated in the Olympic Games for the first time. He was not even being considered for the Sochi Olympics until late January when he placed second at the Quebec world qualifying event. He was the first alternate on the U.S. Ski Team in a World Cup event in Val Saint-Côme, Quebec, and was called up to the event when a teammate was injured and could no longer compete. He was told he needed to be on a plane the next morning, and at one in the morning he booked his flight for 9 a.m. At the World Cup event Mac placed second, which put him in the running for Sochi. He was sitting in AP English class when he received word that he made the team. Mac was the only men's freestyle aerials competitor for the United States. On February 17, 2014, at Rosa Khutor Extreme Park, in the men's freestyle aerials fourth-round qualifying finals Mac placed 5th with a score of 113.72, missing the medal round by one spot.

Personal life
Mac began skiing before he reached the age of two years at Bromley Mountain in Vermont. Both his parents, Libby and David, as well as his older siblings, Lexi and Cody, were avid skiers. Originally from Madison, Connecticut, at age thirteen Mac moved to Lake Placid, New York, in 2008 to pursue his dream of becoming an Olympic skier. Two years later he moved across the country to Park City, Utah. He attended middle school in Connecticut and then did high school classes through an online program. His parents remained in Madison, so Mac moved to the Olympic Training Center by himself.

References

External links

Team USA profile for Mac Bohonnon

1995 births
Living people
American male freestyle skiers
Olympic freestyle skiers of the United States
Freestyle skiers at the 2014 Winter Olympics
Freestyle skiers at the 2018 Winter Olympics
Sportspeople from New Haven, Connecticut